(DAB,) is the central bank of Afghanistan. It regulates all banking and money handling operations in Afghanistan. The bank currently has 46 branches throughout the country, with five of these situated in Kabul, where the headquarters is also based.

Da Afghanistan Bank is a wholly government-owned bank, established in 1939. DAB is active in developing policies to promote financial inclusion and a member of the Alliance for Financial Inclusion.

Bank's seal
The seal of Da Afghanistan Bank has the name of the bank in Pashto at the top and Latin script at the bottom, the year 1939 in which it was established, and a depiction of a Eucratides I-era coin with the Greek text, "" which means "Of the great king Eucratides".

Mission
Basic tasks of DAB are: 
 Formulate, adopt and execute the monetary policy of Afghanistan.
 Hold and manage the official foreign-exchange reserves of Afghanistan.
 Print and issue afghani banknotes and coins.
 Act as banker and adviser to, and as fiscal agent of the state.
 License, regulate and supervise banks, foreign exchange dealers, money service providers, payment system operators, securities service providers, securities transfer system operators.
 Establish, maintain and promote sound and efficient systems for payments, for transfers of securities issued by the state or DAB, and for the clearing and settlement of payment transactions and transactions in such securities.
 Accept foreign bank applications from banks that wish to operate in Afghanistan.

Supreme Council
As of July 2021, the Supreme Council at DAB consisted of:
 Ajmal Ahmady, Acting Governor  and Acting Chairman of Supreme Council
 Dr. Shah Mohammad Mehrabi – Member
 Katrin Fakiri – Member
 Abdul Wakil Muntazer – Member
 Muhammad Naim Azimi – Member

The Supreme Council is currently unknown due to the collapse of the Islamic Republic of Afghanistan in August 2021.

Governors
Habibullah Malie Achekzai, 1954–1960
Abdul Hay Azizi, 1960–1975
Mohammad Hakim Khan, 1975–1980
Ghulam Hussain Jujeni, 1980–1982
Mehrabuddin Paktiawal, 1982–1985
Abdul Basir Ranjbar, 1985–1988
Mohammad Kabir, 1988–1990
Khalil Sediq, 1990–1991
Abdul Wahab Asefi, ?–1991–?
Najibullah Sahu, ?–1992–?
Zabihullah Eltezam, ?–1993
Ghulam Mohammed Yailaqi, 1993
Mohammad Hakim Khan, 1993–1995
Ehsanullah Ehsan, during Taliban era, 1996–1997
Abdul Samad Sani, during Taliban era, 1997–?
Mohammad Ahmadi, during Taliban era, ?–2001
Anwar ul-Haq Ahady, 2002–2004
Noorullah Delwari, 2004–2007
Abdul Qadir Fitrat, 2007–2011
Noorullah Delwari, 2011–2014
Khan Afzal Hadawal, acting, 2014–2015
Khalil Sediq, 2015–2019
Wahidullah Nosher, acting, 2019–2019
Ajmal Ahmady, acting, 2019–2021
Haji Mohammad Idris, acting, during Taliban era, August 2021 – October 2021
Shakir Jalali, acting, during Taliban era, October 2021 – present

Seizure of US-based assets
DAB owned about US$7 billion in assets held at the Federal Reserve Bank of New York. After the 2021 Taliban seizure of power, a group of about 150 relatives of victims of the September 11 attacks attempted to use a judgement from the SDNY case Havlish v. Bin Laden to gain control of these assets, asserting that they were now legally the Taliban's and thus could be used to pay damages to 9/11 victims' families. After a period of deliberation, the Biden administration went along with the request, dividing the assets into two halves, one of which would be allocated to the plaintiffs as potential damages, and the other which would be used to set up a trust fund to "support the needs of the Afghan people" but which the Taliban government would remain barred from accessing. On 26 August 2022, a judge recommended to not award damages as the bank is "immune from jurisdiction" and that it would "acknowledge" the Taliban as the legitimate Afghan government.

See also

Afghan afghani
Afghan frozen assets
Ministry of Finance (Afghanistan)

References

External links
 Da Afghanistan Bank
 Official YouTube channel
 @AFGCentralbank - Official Twitter account, active post-August 30, 2021

Afghanistan
Banks of Afghanistan
Banks established in 1939
Afghanistan
1939 establishments in Afghanistan
Regulation in Afghanistan